McBride Sisters Wine Company is a Black-owned, female-led wine company in the United States. The company was founded in 2005 by African American winemakers Robin and Andréa McBride, who first met as adults and bonded over a shared passion for winemaking. The brand uses grapes from both California and New Zealand, and is focused on providing quality bottled and canned wines that are affordable and "celebrate inclusivity". As of 2020, Wine Spectator noted that it was the largest Black-owned wine company in the US by volume. According to the Boston Globe, McBride Sisters is also "one of the few Black-owned wine labels that encourages consumers to be socially conscious."

Family history 
The McBride sisters grew up far apart in acclaimed winemaking regions, unaware of each other until they were adults. Andréa was raised in Marlborough, New Zealand. At the age of six, she was raised by her uncle and a foster family after her mother died of breast cancer. Robin grew up in Monterey, California. The sisters shared a biological father, Kelly McBride, whom they had had little contact with while growing up. Before he died in 1996, he asked his family to find and connect his two daughters. Following a lengthy search by his family, Robin and Andréa met for first time in 1999 at LaGuardia Airport in New York. They soon discovered a shared interest in winemaking.

Business history 
Robin and Andrea McBride started their business as a boutique import firm with a limited selection of New Zealand wines. In 2010, they founded EcoLove, a brand focused on sustainable wines, sourced from vineyards throughout New Zealand. In 2015, they started Truvée, a brand focused on California Central Coast wines, in partnership with Diageo Chateau & Estate Wines. Starting in 2017, all their wines from New Zealand and California were brought together under the McBride Sisters Collection, and sold in grocery stores across the United States. In the 12 months leading up to October 2020, the McBride Sisters had sold 35,000 cases of wine at retail outlets, according to Nielsen, making it the largest Black-owned wine company by volume. In October 2020, Wine Spectator reported that McBride Sisters  had $5.43 million in annual sales.

Wines 
The company's main labels include the McBride Sisters Collection, which features many wines from the Central Coast of California and from New Zealand, and Black Girl Magic. In 2019, the McBride Sisters also launched an eco-friendly line of canned wine, SHE CAN.

The Black Girl Magic Collection debuted in 2018, and was created "to honor and cater to underserved Black women wine lovers." The first wine in the collection was a riesling. Another is a red blend of merlot and cabernet sauvignon. The most popular set is a trio of Black Girl Magic wine featuring bottles of riesling, zinfandel, and rosé. The Black Girl Magic 2020 California rosé was awarded "Best for TV Binges" by the editors of Cosmopolitan magazine in the Second Annual Cosmo Wine Awards. In December 2020, Washington Post wine columnist Dave McIntyre recommended the Black Girl Magic Sparkling Brut as "delicious".

Corporate social responsibility 
As of 2015, McBride Sisters had a team that was 80 percent female, including their head winemaker and vineyard director. They are members of the Association of African American Vintners (AAAV), which was founded in 2002.

The SHE CAN wine collection also sponsors a professional development fund, which awards scholarships to women. The scholarship fund initially focused on helping women in the wine and spirits industry, but was later expanded to include female entrepreneurs across all industries, and provides mentoring and leadership coaching in addition to financial assistance.

In July 2020, McBride Sisters joined other Black-owned businesses on social media on Blackout Tuesday, by sharing a list of 86 Black vintners on Instagram. The post went viral by after it was shared by celebrities including former professional basketball player Dwyane Wade and actor Gabrielle Union. According to the company, by November 2020, the McBride Sisters brand was carried in 2,697 stores in the United States, up from only 84 stores before May of that year. As of December 2020, McBride Sisters wines were sold at select Target retail stores, and was also marketed nationally at Walmart and Kroger, in addition to being sold direct through the company web site.

References

External links 
 McBride Sisters Wine Company (official website)

Black-owned businesses
Black-owned companies of the United States
Winemakers